Jurinodexia is a genus of parasitic flies in the family Tachinidae.

Distribution
Mexico

Species
Jurinodexia bicolor (Giglio-Tos, 1893)

References

Dexiinae
Diptera of North America
Tachinidae genera
Monotypic Brachycera genera
Taxa named by Charles Henry Tyler Townsend